Longineu Warren "LP" Parsons III (born February 16, 1980) is a French-born American rock musician. He is best known as the former drummer of the American pop punk band Yellowcard.

Early life
Parsons has been playing the drums since he was five; he played with his father, Longineu W. Parsons II, in his band The Longineu Parsons Ensemble.

Music career

Yellowcard (1997–2014)

Parsons joined Yellowcard in 1997 along with Ben Dobson, Todd Clary, Warren Cooke and Ben Harper after meeting at Douglas Anderson School of the Arts. He was with the band ever since 1997's Midget Tossing until 2013's Ocean Avenue Acoustic.

On March 13, 2014, Parsons left Yellowcard. By this point, Parsons had been the only remaining member of the original lineup. According to their Facebook page, the band said in a joint statement, "Longineu has decided to pursue other musical interests. We wish him the best of luck in his future endeavors."

This Legend: (2014–2017)
In June 2014, Parsons and former Yellowcard bandmate Ben Harper formed a new band with Chris Castillo (lead vocals and rhythm guitar) and Steven Neufeld (bass guitar) called This Legend. They released their first album It's In The Streets on November 11, 2014. The band played several shows across the U.S. to promote the album.

As of 2017, the band is on hiatus due to band members' other interests. Parsons began playing drums with Ten Foot Pole and Stages and Stereos.

Vilano Band (2022-present) 
Vilano is a modern rock band from St. Augustine, Florida. The band consists of vocalist Stephen Drawdy, drummer Longineu Parsons III, guitarist Adam Otoski, and bassist Nick Holtz.

Vilano released their full-length album, "No Rain, No Flowers" in March of 2021.

Other work: 2008–present
During the Yellowcard hiatus, Parsons played drums for Adam Lambert from October 2009 through September 2010. Parsons founded rap-rock group LPMD with producer Miles M. Davis.  Their debut album, Off The Record, was released on September 27, 2011.

From 2019 to 2021, Parsons became the touring drummer for the band New Years Day, playing in their first headlining tour.

Discography
Yellowcard

Midget Tossing (1997)
Where We Stand (1999)
Still Standing (2000)
One for the Kids (2001)
The Underdog EP (2002)
Ocean Avenue (2003)
Lights and Sounds (2006)
Paper Walls (2007)
Live from Las Vegas at the Palms (2008)
When You're Through Thinking, Say Yes (2011)
Southern Air (2012)
Ocean Avenue Acoustic (2013)

LPMD
Off the Record (2011)

This Legend

 It's In The Streets (2014)

References

External links

1980 births
21st-century American drummers
21st-century American male musicians
American punk rock drummers
American male drummers
American drummers
Living people
Musicians from Jacksonville, Florida
Yellowcard members